Hieracium caespiticola is a species of flowering plant belonging to the family Asteraceae.

Its native range is Sweden, Finland, and northwestern and northern European Russia.

References

caespiticola
Flora of Sweden
Flora of Finland
Flora of North European Russia
Flora of Northwest European Russia
Plants described in 1889